A Change Is Gonna Come is a 1966 album by organist Brother Jack McDuff which was his first released on the Atlantic label.

Reception
Bruce Eder in his review for Allmusic states, "The tempo and texture shifts throughout keep this record continually interesting to the listener, and the range of influences, from jazz to gospel with side trips into the blues (culminating with a seven-minute epic in the latter genre), gives a lot of great playing for everybody".

Track listing 
All compositions by Jack McDuff except as indicated
 "Down in the Valley" (Traditional; arranged by Jack McDuff) - 2:18    
 "A Change Is Gonna Come" (Sam Cooke) - 3:05
 "Hot Cha" (Willie Woods) - 4:18
 "What'd I Say" (Ray Charles) - 2:33    
 "No Tears" (Red Holloway) - 3:32   
 "Gonna Hang Me Up a Sign" - 2:35    
 "Minha Saudade" (João Donato, João Gilberto) - 5:51    
 "Same Old Same Old" (Roger Kellaway) - 4:42    
 "Can't Find the Keyhole Blues" - 7:17
Recorded in New York City on May 4 (tracks 1, 2, 4 & 6) and May 5 (tracks 3, 5 & 7-9), 1966.

Personnel 
Jack McDuff - organ
Johnny Grimes, Harold Johnson - trumpet (tracks 1, 2, 4 & 6)
Richard Harris - trombone (tracks 1, 2, 4 & 6)
Danny Turner - alto saxophone (tracks 3, 5 & 7-9)
Arthur Clarke (tracks 1, 2, 4 & 6), George Coleman (tracks 3, 5 & 7-9) - tenor saxophone 
Buddy Lucas - baritone saxophone (tracks 1, 2, 4 & 6)
James Oliver - guitar (tracks 1, 2, 4 & 6)
Cornell Dupree - guitar, congas (tracks 3, 5 & 7-9)
Jimmy Tyrell - bass
Joe Dukes (tracks 3, 5 & 7-9), Bernard Purdie - drums
Warren Smith - percussion (tracks 1, 2, 4 & 6)

Other Credits
 Arranged by Jack McDuff (tracks 1, 2, 4 and 6) and J.J. Jackson (tracks 3, 5, 7, 8 and 9)

References 

Jack McDuff albums
1966 albums
Atlantic Records albums